St Matthew's Church, Duddeston and Nechells is a Grade II listed parish church in the Church of England in Birmingham.

History

The church was designed by the architect William Thomas of Leamington Spa. The foundation stone was laid in October 1839.  It was consecrated by the Bishop of Worcester in October 1840. It was built as a daughter church to St Peter and Paul's Church, Aston and was the first of the five churches built by the Birmingham Church Building Society.

In 1866, J.A. Chatwin added galleries to increase the seating capacity. The church was restored in 1883.

In 1868 part of the parish was taken to form that of St Lawrence's Church, Duddeston. When St Lawrence closed in 1951, the parish was reunited.

In 1898 part of the parish was taken to form that of St Anne's Church, Duddeston. When St Anne closed in 1951, the parish was reunited.

In 1994 a rebuilding scheme converted the church in a multi-purpose building, with a worship area for 250 people at the east end, and office and community accommodation in the remaining portion.

References

Church of England church buildings in Birmingham, West Midlands
Grade II listed buildings in Birmingham
Churches completed in 1840
William Thomas (architect) buildings